The Unseen Vengeance is a 1914 American silent short drama film directed by Tom Ricketts. Starring Harry von Meter, Vivian Rich, and Charlotte Burton.

Cast
 Harry von Meter as John Holland
 Vivian Rich as Kate, his wife
 Charlotte Burton as Olga
 Robert Klein as Her father
 Edith Borella as Hostess
 B. Reeves Eason as Host
 Jack Richardson as George Sherwood, editor
 Cupid Cavens as The boy, 5 years old
 Cora Morrison as Maid
 William Vaughn as Doctor

External links

1914 films
1914 drama films
Silent American drama films
American silent short films
American black-and-white films
1914 short films
Films directed by Tom Ricketts
1910s American films